John Haviland (15 December 1792 – 28 March 1852) was an English-born American architect who was a major figure in American Neo-Classical architecture, and one of the most notable architects working from Philadelphia in the 19th century.

Biography
Born 15 December 1792, at Gundenham, near Wellington, England, Haviland was apprenticed in 1811 to a London architect. In 1815 he unsuccessfully pursued an appointment to the Russian Imperial Corps of Engineers. In Russia, however, he met George von Sonntag and John Quincy Adams, who encouraged him to work in the United States. He arrived in Philadelphia in 1816, and soon established himself as one of the few professional architects in the city.

By 1818, Haviland produced a book, The Builder's Assistant, which appeared in three volumes over several years. This publication was one of the earliest architectural pattern books written and published in North America, and likely the first to include Greek and Roman classical orders.

In part due to The Builder's Assistant, Haviland began to secure what would be his most important commissions in Philadelphia: the Eastern State Penitentiary,  the Pennsylvania Institution for the Deaf and Dumb (now Dorrance Hamilton Hall, University of the Arts), and the original Franklin Institute building (now home to the Atwater Kent Museum).

During this time, Haviland unwisely speculated in his own projects, including commercial arcades in Philadelphia and New York, as well as an amusement park. He was eventually forced into bankruptcy, tarnishing his professional reputation in Philadelphia. Elsewhere, however, Haviland's reputation as a designer of prisons brought him important commissions, including the New Jersey Penitentiary, The Tombs in New York City, and prisons in Missouri, Rhode Island, and Arkansas.

Haviland was an Honorary and Corresponding Member of the Royal Institute of British Architects.  In 1827, he was elected into the National Academy of Design as an Honorary Academician.

Personal life
On July 2, 1819, Haviland was married to Mary Wright von Sonntag by the Right Rev. William White, Bishop of Pennsylvania.  She was the sister of George von Sonntag and the daughter of Captain William Ludwig von Sonntag of the French Army. They had a son,
John von Sonntag de Havilland (1826–1886).

Edward Haviland, also a prison architect, was born to John as well.

He died March 28, 1852, in Philadelphia and was buried in the family vault at St. Andrews Church (designed by Haviland) in Philadelphia (now the Greek Orthodox Cathedral of St. George).

Architectural work, partial listing

Philadelphia buildings
 Additions & alterations to Old City Hall, 5th & Chestnut Sts., Philadelphia (1820).
 First Presbyterian Church (Washington Square Presbyterian), SE corner 7th & Locust Sts., Philadelphia (1820–22, demolished 1939).
 St. Andrew's Episcopal Church, 256 S. 8th St., Philadelphia (1822–23). Now Greek Orthodox Cathedral of St. George.
 Pennsylvania Institution for the Deaf and Dumb, NW corner Broad & Pine Sts., Philadelphia (1824–26). Now Dorance Hamilton Hall, University of the Arts.
 Franklin Institute, 15 S. 7th St., Philadelphia (1825). Now the Atwater Kent Museum.
 Philadelphia Arcade, 615-19 Chestnut St., Philadelphia (1826–27, demolished 1860). The first American enclosed shopping gallery.
 Walnut Street Theater, 9th & Walnut Sts., Philadelphia (1827–28). Oldest continuously operated theater in the U.S.
 Eastern State Penitentiary, Fairmount Avenue between Corinthian Avenue and North 22nd St., Philadelphia (1829).
 Boston Row, NW corner 12th & Chestnut Sts., Philadelphia (1830).
 Independence Hall, 5th & 6th streets, renovation of second story (1831) and restoration of assembly room (1833)
 Egyptian Revival style Pennsylvania Fire Insurance building, 1838, Philadelphia 
 Kensington Commissioner's Hall, Frankford Avenue & Master Street (1833–34), still standing in 1878, demolished by c1890.[7]

Buildings elsewhere
 Monument to prison reformer John Howard in Kherson, Ukraine
 U.S. Naval Asylum, Portsmouth, VA (1827).
 Miner's Bank, Pottsville, PA (1830–31, demolished).
 New Jersey State Penitentiary, near Trenton (1832–6).
 Rebuilding of Pittsburgh Penitentiary (Western Penitentiary) (1833–36).
 The Tombs (Hall of Justice), New York, NY (1835–38, demolished 1902).
 Missouri State Penitentiary, Jefferson City, MO (1836). Closed in 2004.
 Essex County Jail, New Street, Newark, NJ (1836–38). Abandoned since 1971.
 Newark County Hall, Newark, NJ
 Berks County Jail, Reading, PA (1848).
 Harrisburg State Hospital AKA Pennsylvania State Lunatic Hospital, Harrisburg, PA (1848–51).
 Lancaster County Jail, 625 E. King Street, Lancaster, PA (1851).
 Rhode Island State Penitentiary
 (Old) Allegheny County Jail, Pittsburgh, PA.
 York County Hall, York, PA.
 Luzerne County Jail, Wilkes-Barre, Pennsylvania (circa 1850).

Gallery

References

External links 
 Philadelphia Inquirer, 30 April 1833, page 2
Art and the empire city: New York, 1825-1861, an exhibition catalog from The Metropolitan Museum of Art (fully available online as PDF), which contains material on Haviland (see index)
 Haviland biography at Philadelphia Architects and Buildings
 Haviland biography at ushistory.org
 Haviland obituary, Pennsylvania Journal of Prison Discipline and Philanthropy, v. 7, no. 3, July 1852, p. 97-107.
 Haviland prints and photographs at the U.S. Library of Congress

1792 births
1852 deaths
19th-century American architects
American ecclesiastical architects
People from Taunton
Architects from Philadelphia
Greek Revival architects
English emigrants to the United States